Elipsocus abdominalis is a species of Psocoptera from the Elipsocidae family that can be found in Great Britain and Ireland. They are also common in countries like Austria, Benelux, Cyprus,  France, Germany, Greece, Hungary, Italy, Poland, Romania, Spain, Switzerland, and Scandinavia. The species are blackish-orange coloured and are similar to Caecilius fuscopterus.

Habitat
The species feed on beech, birch, hawthorn, larch, oak and yew.

References

Elipsocidae
Insects described in 1904
Psocoptera of Europe